The Bandar Utama station is a mass rapid transit (MRT) station serving the suburb of Bandar Utama in Petaling Jaya, Selangor, Malaysia as well as parts of Taman Tun Dr Ismail, Kuala Lumpur which lie across the Damansara–Puchong Expressway from the station.

It is one of the stations on the Sungai Buloh-Kajang Line. It was opened on 16 December 2016.

This station is located next to the 1 Utama Shopping Centre, one of the biggest shopping malls in the Klang Valley. Other well-known landmarks near the station are Sri Pentas (headquarters of terrestrial TV channels owned by Media Prima), the One World Hotel, Plaza IBM and KPMG Tower, which are linked to the station via a pedestrian link-bridge.

This station will serve as an interchange station with the future Shah Alam Line, a light rapid transit (LRT) station currently under construction which will link Bandar Utama with Johan Setia in Klang.

Station Features

The station is located beside the Damansara-Puchong Expressway (LDP) directly behind the Sri Pentas Building in Bandar Utama. The station's support columns are located between the expressway and the water channel which runs parallel to the expressway.

The station adopts the standard elevated station design for the Sungai Buloh-Kajang Line with two side platforms above the concourse level.

However, unlike the other elevated stations, there are no escalators, lifts or staircases linking the station directly with the ground level, neither are there any lay-bys for buses, taxis and cars at the ground level directly below the station. Access to the station is via link bridges from the 1Powerhouse Building, where the feeder bus stop and park and ride facilities are located, and from the One World Hotel and 1 Utama complex.

Station layout

Exits and entrances
Access to the station is via two pedestrian link bridges - one connecting Entrance A of the station to the neighbouring 1Powerhouse Building, and another connecting Entrance B with the One World Hotel. The second link bridge was opened on 1 February 2018.

All these buildings are owned by Bandar Utama City Corporation Sdn Bhd, making this station the only one in the MRT Sungai Buloh-Kajang Line where access to the station is via properties owned by other entities. There is no access to the station from the ground level directly beneath the station along the Damansara–Puchong Expressway. The lay-by and stairs at this location are for emergency purposes only.

The 1Powerhouse Building houses the feeder bus stop at the ground level, and the park and ride facility for the station which takes up two basement levels. Taxi and private vehicle drop-off areas are also located at the ground floor of the building.

History
During the planning stage, the station was referred to as the One Utama Station as it was situated next to the 1 Utama Shopping Centre. However, it was officially renamed the Bandar Utama station just prior to its opening in 2016 after the suburb it is situated in rather than the name of the commercial complex.

A pedestrian bridge linking the station to the Burhanuddin Helmi section of Taman Tun Dr Ismail residential area which is geographically located directly across the Damansara-Puchong Expressway from station was also proposed as part of the plans. This would have enabled residents of the northern part of the residential area to have access to the station, while the southern part would be served by the TTDI station which lies 200 metres from the TTDI Wet Market. However, the TTDI Residents Association (RA) objected to the link, citing parking by MRT commuters along Burhanuddin Helmi's roads and illegal stalls as a result of the link. The RA collected signatures of objections from residents, despite MRT Corp's pleas to proceed with the pedestrian bridge for the benefit of the residents.

In the end, in July 2014, MRT acceded to the objection. Once operational however, there were voices of dissent on the lack of connectivity for the residents of TTDI's northern tip.

From its opening on 16 December 2016 till 31 January 2018, the only access to the station was from the 1Powerhouse Building via the pedestrian overhead bridge at Entrance A. The temporary linkway to One World Hotel and subsequently to 1 Utama from the station's Entrance B was opened on 1 February 2018, allowing a more direct connection to the shopping centre.

Bus Services

Feeder buses
With the opening of the MRT Sungai Buloh-Kajang Line, feeder buses also began operating linking the residential areas in Taman Tun Dr Ismail, Bandar Utama and Kampung Sungai Penchala. The feeder buses operate from the station's feeder bus stop at the adjacent 1Powerhouse building accessed via Entrance A of the station. These buses do not stop at the Bandar Utama bus hub.

Other buses

Park and Ride

Bandar Utama MRT station has an adjoining park and ride facility which is located at levels B1 and B2 of the 1 Powerhouse Building. Access to the park and ride facility is via Entrance A and the pedestrian link bridge that connects the station with 1Powerhouse. The facility has around 500 bays.

The park and ride facility is provided by the owners of the 1Powerhouse Building, Bandar Utama City Centre Sdn Bhd, and not the owner or operator of the MRT Sungai Buloh-Kajang Line. As a result, the parking charges are determined by the owner.

MRT users (except for those who board trains at six stations nearest to Bandar Utama MRT station) are charged a flat rate of 4 ringgit Malaysia per entry per day. As the parking facility does not use the Touch 'n Go electronic purse system for payment, MRT users must verify their status with their Touch 'n Go cards used on the MRT at the parking payment machines at the park and ride facility in order to enjoy the flat rate.

MRT users who board trains at the Kota Damansara, Surian, Mutiara Damansara, Taman Tun Dr Ismail, Phileo Damansara and Pusat Bandar Damansara stations do not qualify for the flat rate charges (because the flat fee is only applicable to MRT riders who have travelled more than 3 MRT Stations away from Bandar Utama MRT).

The park and ride facility is separate from the upper floor parking which are meant for 1Powerhouse occupants, including guests of the Avante Hotel which is part of the building. Park and ride flat rate charges are not available at the upper floor parking, where hourly parking charges apply.

Gallery

Station

1Powerhouse (Entrance A), Feeder Bus Stop and Park and Ride

One World Hotel Pedestrian Link (Entrance B)

See also
Kajang line
Bandar Utama–Klang line
Bandar Utama
Taman Tun Dr Ismail
1 Utama Shopping Centre

References

External links
 Klang Valley Mass Rapid Transit website
 Unofficial information resource on the MRT

Rapid transit stations in Selangor
Sungai Buloh-Kajang Line
Shah Alam Line
Railway stations opened in 2016